The 31st Indian Brigade was an infantry brigade of the British Indian Army that saw active service with the Indian Army during the First World War.  It served in Egypt in 1915 before being broken up in February 1916.

History
The 11th Indian Division was formed in Egypt on 24 December 1914, taking under command the 22nd (Lucknow) and 32nd (Imperial Service) Brigades.  The 31st Indian Brigade was formed in January 1915 as the division's third brigade and served with it on the Suez Canal Defences.  After the defeat of the Turkish attempts to cross the canal on 3–4 February 1915, the division acted as a relieving depot for the divisions in France.  The division was broken up on 31 May 1915 and the brigade came under direct command of the Suez Canal Defences.

On 7 January 1916, the 10th Indian Division was reformed as part of the Suez Canal District, and the brigade joined it.  The need to return depleted units that had served in France to India meant that this was short-lived.  The brigade was broken up in February and the division followed in March.

Orders of battle

Commander
The brigade was commanded throughout its existence by Brigadier-General A.H. Bingley.

See also

 Force in Egypt

Notes

References

Bibliography

External links
 

Brigades of India in World War I
Military units and formations established in 1915
Military units and formations disestablished in 1916